Sérgio José Organista Aguiar (born 26 August 1984), known as Organista, is a Portuguese former professional footballer who played as a midfielder.

Club career
Organista was born in Vila do Conde. A product of FC Porto's youth academy, he would never appear officially for its main squad, spending two years with the reserve team and being loaned to C.D. Santa Clara in the 2004–05 season (Segunda Liga).

Subsequently, Organista spent three years with Pontevedra CF in the Spanish Segunda División B, the first still on loan. In August 2008 he agreed on a loan return to Portugal with C.F. Os Belenenses, being very rarely played as the Lisbon-based club was eventually relegated from the Primeira Liga – later reinstated.

In the summer of 2009, Organista was released by Pontevedra and signed for OFI Crete F.C. in Greece's second division. After a brief spell in Bulgaria he resumed his career in his country's second tier, appearing for Portimonense SC, F.C. Penafiel, G.D. Chaves and Varzim SC.

International career
Organista was part of the Portugal under-21 squad at the 2007 UEFA European Championship, but did not play any games. Two years earlier he appeared for the nation at the Toulon Tournament, scoring two penalty kicks in as many matches (both wins) in a final runner-up position.

Personal life
Organista's older brother, Miguel, was also a footballer. Among others, he represented C.D. Nacional and S.L. Benfica.

References

External links

1984 births
Living people
People from Vila do Conde
Sportspeople from Porto District
Portuguese footballers
Association football midfielders
Primeira Liga players
Liga Portugal 2 players
Segunda Divisão players
FC Porto B players
C.D. Santa Clara players
C.F. Os Belenenses players
Portimonense S.C. players
F.C. Penafiel players
G.D. Chaves players
Varzim S.C. players
Segunda División B players
Pontevedra CF footballers
Football League (Greece) players
OFI Crete F.C. players
First Professional Football League (Bulgaria) players
PFC CSKA Sofia players
Akademik Sofia players
Portugal youth international footballers
Portugal under-21 international footballers
Portugal B international footballers
Portuguese expatriate footballers
Expatriate footballers in Spain
Expatriate footballers in Greece
Expatriate footballers in Bulgaria
Portuguese expatriate sportspeople in Spain
Portuguese expatriate sportspeople in Greece
Portuguese expatriate sportspeople in Bulgaria